Various governments require a certification of voting machines.

In the United States there is only a voluntary federal certification for voting machines and each state has ultimate jurisdiction over certification, though most states currently require national certification for the voting systems.

Germany
In Germany the Physikalisch-Technische Bundesanstalt was responsible for certification of the voting machines for federal and European elections till 2009. Since the respective law, the Bundeswahlgeräteverordnung ("Federal Voting Machine Ordinance") is considered to be in contradiction to Germany's Constitution, this responsibility is suspended. The only machines certified so far are the Nedap ESD1 and ESD2.

United States

See also
 Election Assistance Commission
 Electronic voting
 Help America Vote Act
 Independent verification systems
 National Institute of Standards and Technology
 National Software Reference Library
 Preventing Election fraud: Testing and certification of electronic voting
 Technical Guidelines Development Committee of the National Institute of Standards and Technology
 Voting machine

References

External links
 2002 Voting Systems Standards 
  National Institutes of Standards and Technology and the Help America Vote Act (HAVA)
 Voting System Certification & Laboratory Accreditation
 National Association of State Election Directors
 Federal Election Commission official website

Election technology